Zhang Jian (born 22 February 1962) is a Chinese fencer. He competed in the team foil event at the 1984 Summer Olympics.

References

External links
 

1962 births
Living people
Chinese male fencers
Olympic fencers of China
Fencers at the 1984 Summer Olympics